The Panti Sisters is a 2019 Filipino comedy film directed by Jun Lana, starring Paolo Ballesteros, Martin del Rosario and Christian Bables. The film was produced by Black Sheep Productions, ALV Films, The IdeaFirst Company and Quantum Films and is distributed by ABS-CBN Films. The film is one of the entries for the Pista ng Pelikulang Pilipino 2019. The film was released on September 13, 2019.

Cast

Main cast
Paolo Ballesteros as Gabriel Panti
Martin del Rosario as Daniel Panti
Christian Bables as Samuel Panti

Supporting cast
John Arcilla as Don Emilio Montemayor Zobel Ayala y Panti
Carmi Martin as Nora Panti
Rosanna Roces as Vilma Panti
Joross Gamboa as Zernan
Roxanne Barcelo as Kat
Via Antonio as Chiqui

Guest cast
Ali Forbes
Cedrick Juan
Mark McMahon 
Addy Raj
Luis Hontiveros

Release
The Panti Sisters had its theatrical release as part of the 2019 Pista ng Pelikulang Pilipino Film festival which ran from September 13 to 19, 2019. However screening of the film ran beyond the duration film festival.

Television release

Pay-per-view
The film premiered on Kapamilya Box Office from February 21-25, 2020.

Cable television
The film premiered on Cinema One on May 16, 2020 and on Kapamilya Channel on August 3, 2020.

Free-to-air
The film premiered on A2Z on May 13, 2021.

Accolades

Sequel
On November 8, 2019, after the film being a success, it was announced that a sequel is now in the works.

References

2019 films
Films directed by Jun Robles Lana